Tiffany Roberts is an American politician from Maine. Roberts, a Democrat from South Berwick, has served in the Maine House of Representatives since 2019.

Political career 
Roberts was elected in the 2018 election. She represents District 6, which contains parts of North Berwick and South Berwick.

References 

Year of birth missing (living people)
Living people
People from South Berwick, Maine
21st-century American women politicians
21st-century American politicians
Democratic Party members of the Maine House of Representatives
Women state legislators in Maine